Wadala Khurd  is a village in Kapurthala district of Punjab State, India. The village is administrated by a Sarpanch, who is an elected representative.

Demography 
According to the report published by Census India in 2011, Wadala Khurd has 108 houses with the total population of 516 persons of which 284 are male and 232 females. Literacy rate of  Wadala Khurd is 81.41%, higher than the state average of 75.84%.  The population of children in the age group 0–6 years is 48 which is  9.30% of the total population.  Child sex ratio is approximately 778, lower than the state average of 846.

Population data

References

External links
  Villages in Kapurthala
 Kapurthala Villages List

Villages in Kapurthala district